Colomoncagua is a municipality in the Honduran department of Intibucá.

It is a municipality of much beauty known for its natural reserves. It is a safe place known for its hospitable residents. There is great meaning behind the name Colomoncagua, it refers to hills surrounded by water. Colomoncagua is surrounded by a vast expansion of pine trees. The climate is quite favorable year round. There are various tourist attractions as well, such as Chorreron Waterfall, La Piedra del Almanaque, El Cerro El Pelon, etc. Year round there are various cultural festivities. Colomoncagua is also known for its coffee and apples.

Demographics
At the time of the 2013 Honduras census, Colomoncagua municipality had a population of 18,214. Of these, 97.07% were Mestizo, 1.87% Indigenous (1.75% Lenca), 0.96% White and 0.11% Afro-Honduran or Black.

References

Municipalities of the Intibucá Department